John II may refer to:

People
 John Cicero, Elector of Brandenburg (1455–1499)
 John II Casimir Vasa of Poland (1609–1672)
 John II Comyn, Lord of Badenoch (died 1302)
 John II Doukas of Thessaly (1303–1318)
 John II Komnenos (1087–1143), Byzantine emperor
 John II of Alençon (1409–1476)
 John II of Amalfi (died 1069)
 John II of Aragon and Navarre (1397–1479)
 John II of Brienne, Count of Eu (died 1302)
 John II of Castile (1405–1454)
 John II of Cyprus, King from 1432 until his death in 1458
 John II, Count of Dreux (1265–1309)
 John II of France (1319–1364)
 John II of Gaeta (died 963)
 John II, Count of Gorizia (1438-1462)
 John II of Jerusalem (1259–1285)
 John II of Luxembourg, Count of Ligny (1392–1440)
 John II, Marquess of Montferrat (1321–1372)
 John II of Naples (died 919)
 John II of Portugal (1455–1495), King of Portugal and of the Algarves
 John II of Salerno (died )
 John II of the Sedre, Syrian Orthodox Patriarch of Antioch in 631–648
 John II of Trebizond (c. 1262 – 1297)
 John II of Werle (after 1250–1337)
 John II Orsini (died 1335), Count of Cephalonia and ruler of Epirus
 John II Platyn (died 702), Exarch of Ravenna
 John II Stanley of the Isle of Man (c. 1386–1437)
 John II, Bishop of Jerusalem
 John II, Burgrave of Nuremberg (c.1309–1357)
 John II, Count of Blois (died 1381)
 John II, Count of Holland (1247–1304)
 John II, Count of Nassau-Beilstein (died 1513)
 John II of Nassau-Saarbrücken (1423-1472)
 John II, Count of Nassau-Siegen (died 1443)
 John II, Count of Nevers (1415–1491)
 John II, Count of Saarbrücken (before 1325–1381)
 John II, Count of Ziegenhain (d. 1450)
 John II, Count Palatine of Zweibrücken (1584–1635)
 John II, Duke of Bavaria (1341–1397)
 John II, Duke of Bourbon (1426–1488)
 John II, Duke of Brabant (1275–1312)
 John II, Duke of Brittany (1239–1305)
 John II, Duke of Lorraine (1425–1470)
 John II, Duke of Mecklenburg-Stargard (1370–1416)
 John II, Duke of Opava-Ratibor (after 1365–1424)
 John II, Duke of Saxe-Weimar (1570–1605)
 John II, Duke of Sonderburg (1545–1622)
 John II, Prince of Anhalt-Zerbst (died 1382)
 John IV of Portugal (16031656), known as John II, Duke of Braganza before becoming king in 1640
 John of Cappadocia (died 520), Patriarch of Constantinople
 John II, King of Denmark (1455–1513), King of Denmark, Norway and Sweden (John II of Sweden)
 John of Islay, Earl of Ross (1435–1503)
 John Papa ʻĪʻī, 19th century politician and historian in the Kingdom of Hawaii
 John Sigismund Zápolya or Szapolyai, King of Hungary as John II, and later the first Prince of Transylvania
 John the Fearless (1371–1419), Duke of Burgundy
 John, Duke of Randazzo (died 1348)
 Patriarch John II Codonatus of Antioch (ruled in 476–477)
 Pope John II, Pope from 533 until his death in 535
 Yohannes II of Ethiopia (died 1769)

Biblical

 John 2, the second chapter of the Gospel of John
 Second Epistle of John or 2 John

See also

 Juan II (disambiguation)
 Jean II (disambiguation)

Human name disambiguation pages